SMIL or Smil may refer to:
SMIL (computer), a Swedish first-generation computer
Synchronized Multimedia Integration Language, a www-standard markup language for multimedia presentations, including playlists and animated SVGs
Vaclav Smil (born 1943), Czech-Canadian scientist and policy analyst
smil.mil, an access to SIPRNet

See also
 Smile (disambiguation)